Robert Charles Smith (born February 12, 1947) is a political science professor at San Francisco State University (SFSU). He is known for his scholarship on race and politics in the United States, about which he has written several books. The "Black Politics" class he began teaching at SFSU in 1990 proved controversial; students protested the class because it was offered in the political science department rather than the African American studies department, which was interpreted by some students as encroaching on the latter department's area of focus.

References

External links
Faculty page

African-American political scientists
Living people
1947 births
People from Benton, Louisiana
University of California, Berkeley alumni
University of California, Los Angeles alumni
Howard University alumni
San Francisco State University faculty